The Women's 10 kilometre freestyle competition at the FIS Nordic World Ski Championships 2021 was held on 2 March. A qualification was held on 24 February 2021.

Results

Final
The race was started on 2 March at 13:15.

Qualification
The qualification was started on 24 February at 09:00.

References

Women's 10 kilometre freestyle